Pornpim Srisurat (born 8 March 1968) is a Thai sprinter. She competed in the women's 4 × 100 metres relay at the 1992 Summer Olympics.

References

1968 births
Living people
Athletes (track and field) at the 1992 Summer Olympics
Pornpim Srisurat
Pornpim Srisurat
Place of birth missing (living people)
Asian Games medalists in athletics (track and field)
Pornpim Srisurat
Athletes (track and field) at the 1990 Asian Games
Medalists at the 1990 Asian Games
Olympic female sprinters
Pornpim Srisurat
Pornpim Srisurat